Jung Seon-ho (born 25 March 1989) is a South Korean footballer who plays as midfielder for Daegu FC.

Career
He joined Seongnam FC in 2013 after playing for Korea National League side Ulsan Hyundai Mipo.

Honors and awards

Player
Daegu FC
 Korean FA Cup Winners (1) : 2018

References

External links 

1989 births
Living people
Association football midfielders
South Korean footballers
Ulsan Hyundai Mipo Dockyard FC players
Seongnam FC players
Gimcheon Sangmu FC players
Daegu FC players
Korea National League players
K League 1 players
Dong-Eui University alumni